Bloody Flesh ("Flesh of Your Flesh") is a 1983 Colombian drama horror film written and directed by Carlos Mayolo.

Plot
On August 6, 1956 the Grandmother from an upper-class family in Cali dies.  The descendants are called to her house to hear the will of the grandmother, two of the heirs are teenagers Andrés Alfonso and his half sister Margaret, who has just arrived from the United States.  At dawn of the next day, a mysterious explosion occurs in the city, so the family moves to its house in the countryside.  Andrés and Margaret are asked to go to a nearly farm, "La Emma", for supplies and to tell their great-uncle Enrique about the death of the grandmother (his sister), who also left him an inheritance.

Enrique is considered the "black sheep" of the family because of his Communistic beliefs. Andrés and Margaret slowly develop a strong attraction, resulting in an incestuous relationship that mirrors their ancestors, whose ghosts begin possessing both them.  The lovers start murdering and spreading terror in the region.  Both become cannibalistic and vampiric creatures, similar to indigenous myths as "Madremonte".  By taking a victim's son of a peasant family, the brothers are killed and buried.

The family is seeking Andrés and Margaret, ignoring their actions.  Later, a farmer discovers the place where the two teenagers were buried and left it shocked after seeing the lovers rise from their grave.

Cast
 Adriana Herrán as Margareth
 David Guerrero as Andrés Alfonso
 Santiago García as Andrés' father
 Vicky Hernandez as Julia

Reception

Critical reception

Bloody Flesh was re-released for DVD on January 8, 2013. George Pacheco, blogger from 10K bullets, called the film "a memorable little film, despite its apparent, initial limitations". Ian Jane, from Rock Shock Pop, wrote "There’s a bit of a learning curve here, maybe, but even with those obstacles it’s easy to appreciate the mood and atmosphere that Mayolo... is able to conjure up in the latter half of this odd movie."

Accolades
The film participated in the 1984 Bogotá Film Festival, where it won the Best Cinematography award. The next year was screened  at Fantasporto, where was nominated for Best Film and won the Best Actress award for Adriana Herrán.

References

External links

1983 films
1983 horror films
Colombian horror films
Incest in film
Films set in Colombia
Films shot in Colombia
Films about cannibalism